Wednesday is the seventh studio album by King Creosote. It was released in 1999 on Fence Records.

Track listing
Little paint 
T-reg kiosk 
All my legs 
Madam 
Today begins without me 
911 
A paux fas bullshite 
Turtles beentween me an rger dog

References
 King Creosote – Vintage Quays

1999 albums
King Creosote albums